The third electoral unit of the Federation of Bosnia and Herzegovina is a parliamentary constituency used to elect members to the House of Representatives of the Federation of Bosnia and Herzegovina since 2000.  Located within Tuzla Canton, it consists of the municipalities of Tuzla, Lukavac, Srebrenik and Čelić.

Demographics

Representatives

References

Constituencies of Bosnia and Herzegovina